One-Week Bachelors is a Swedish comedy film from 1982, directed by .  The film premiered on the theaters on December 16, 1982.

Plot
The architect Gary Stenström is at Arlanda and has just waved by his wife who is going to Geneva at a conference. After the airbus has driven him out, he gets lifted by car mechanic Lasse  who is Gary's straight opposite. Gary's plans to have a quiet week as a grassland change are radically changing and he is experiencing a whole new world with Lasse.

Cast
 Gösta Ekman as Gary
 Janne Carlsson as Lasse
 Lena Olin as Nina
 Mona Seilitz as  Inga-Lill
 Lis Nilheim as  Lilian
 Peter Harryson as  Göran
 Lennart R. Svensson as  Rune
 Lena Nyman as  Maggan
 Marika Lindström as  Viveka
 Svante Grundberg as  Staffan
 Börje Nyberg as Brogren
 Stig Ossian Ericson as Hypnotist
 Johannes Brost as Bank robber
 Claire Wikholm as Secretary
 Roland Janson as policeman
 Michael Segerström as policeman
 Peter Schildt as policeman
 Ann-Sofie Kylin as Anki
 Kim Anderzon as hypnosis lady
 Marvin Yxner as hypnosis man 
 Åsa Bjerkerot as Mia
 Nils Eklund as Mia's father
 Gregor Dahlman as taxi driver
 Palle Granditsky as Mayor
 Joel Fänge as August Carlsson
 Christina Lindberg as stripper
 Gunwer Bergkvist as Lady with pram
 Luc Bouy	 as restaurant employee

References

External links
   

Swedish comedy films
1982 comedy films
1982 films
1980s Swedish films